Take a Vacation! is the only studio album by American rock band the Young Veins, and the first musical project by Ryan Ross and Jon Walker after their departure from Panic! at the Disco.

Critics have compared the album's sound to the music of 1960s groups such as the Beatles, the Beach Boys, the Kinks, the Hollies, the Searchers, and the Zombies, and have noted its similarities to the earlier Panic! album Pretty. Odd.

Background and production
While on tour with Panic! at the Disco in 2008, Ryan Ross and Jon Walker began writing songs intended for the band's third album, but after showing the other members the songs they were working on it became apparent that a split was occurring over the direction that the band wanted to go in.

On July 6, 2009, Ross and Walker departed from Panic! at the Disco. They soon gathered in Los Angeles and began recording the songs they had originally prepared for the next Panic! album. They were aided with the help of Alex Greenwald of Phantom Planet, who ended up producing seven tracks out of eleven, and Rob Mathes who produced four songs out of the album. He had also produced Pretty. Odd. with Panic! at the Disco.

Release
On July 28, 2009, Ross and Walker announced their new band was entitled The Young Veins and premiered a new song, "Change", on their Myspace profile.  On October 20, 2009, "The Other Girl" was made available for streaming.

"Change" was released as a single on April 6, 2010. "Take a Vacation!" was released on May 18 as the next single. "Everyone But You" was released as the third single on May 25. Take a Vacation! was released on June 8 through One Heaven Music. Several editions of the album featured a variety of bonus tracks: a cover of the Everly Brothers song "Nothing Matters But You" (iTunes edition), a cover of the Wanda Jackson song "Funnel of Love" (Amazon.com edition), a cover of the Brenda Lee song "Is It True?" (Amie Street edition), and a cover of the Otis Redding song "Security" and a cover of the Searchers song "When You Walk in the Room" (UK edition).

Several special box sets were made available exclusively for pre-order. One box set included a View-Master, with seven photos of the band. The box set also included a special lithograph image of the band. Another box set included a vinyl copy of the album along with the CD version, the View-Master with pictures, the special lithograph, a beach towel, a beach ball, sunglasses, a beach bag and a personally-signed postcard from the band.

A deluxe version was released without any prior announcement on January 1, 2019.

Track listing

Personnel
The album was recorded before Ross and Walker recruited the other three members of the band. They played all of the parts listed below and were aided with assistance from friends.

The Young Veins
Ryan Ross – vocals, guitars, percussion
Jon Walker – vocals, guitars, bass guitars, percussion

Additional musicians
Alex Greenwald – backing vocals, lead guitars, bass guitars, wurlitzer, harmonium, stylophone, percussion
Eric Ronick – backing vocals and keyboards
Than Luu – backing vocals, drums, percussion
Jason Boesel – drums and percussion (on "Lie to the Truth")
Z Berg – guest vocals (on "Heart of Mine" and "Nothing Matters But You")
Michael Runion – guest vocals (on "Heart of Mine")
Danny Fujikawa – guest vocals (on "Heart of Mine")
Michael Fujikawa – guest vocals (on "Heart of Mine")

Production
Rob Mathes – producer at Castle Oak Studios
Alex Greenwald – producer at Sunset Sound Studios
Kevin Harp – engineer and mixing
Joshua Blanchard – assistant engineer at Castle Oak Studios
Morgan Stratton – assistant engineer at Sunset Sound Studios
Fred Kevorkian – mastering

Release history

References

The Young Veins albums
2010 albums
Garage rock revival albums
Albums produced by Rob Mathes